Robert Morrison (March 16, 1909 – July 8, 1999) was an American attorney and politician. He served as Attorney General of Arizona from 1955 to 1959.

Early life and education 
Morrison was born in Parlier, California. He worked as a farmer in California before relocating to Arizona during the Great Depression. He earned his Bachelor's and law degrees from the University of Arizona.

Career 
He was elected Pima County Attorney in 1950, serving for one term. In 1952, Morrison unsuccessfully challenged Fred O. Wilson in the Democratic primary for Arizona Attorney General. Shortly after the election, Morrison participated in the prosecution of his primary opponent Wilson during the latter's 1953 bribery trial. Morrison would run again in the 1954 election, defeating democrat Jack Choisser and incumbent Ross F. Jones.  In 1958, Morrison unsuccessfully ran for governor, losing to Paul Fannin.

References 

1909 births
1999 deaths
James E. Rogers College of Law alumni
Arizona Attorneys General
20th-century American lawyers
Arizona Democrats
District attorneys in Arizona